Broadford is an unincorporated community in Smyth County, Virginia, United States. Broadford has a post office with ZIP code 24316.

References

Unincorporated communities in Smyth County, Virginia
Unincorporated communities in Virginia